Matúš Repa (born 20 July 2002) is a Slovak footballer who plays as a forward.

Club career
Repa made his professional Fortuna Liga debut for FK Senica against FC Spartak Trnava on 29 October 2021.

References

External links
 FK Senica official club profile 
 Futbalnet profile 
 
 

2002 births
Living people
People from Galanta
Sportspeople from the Trnava Region
Slovak footballers
Association football forwards
FK Senica players
Slovak Super Liga players